Matador: The Songs of Leonard Cohen is the fifth solo album recorded by the Canadian singer Patricia O'Callaghan and was released by the Marquis Classics label in January 2012.

Matador won almost immediate critical acclaim. Christopher Loudon described it in a review for JazzTimes magazine as a "superb collection of Leonard Cohen gems" recorded by "arguably Canada's most gifted jazz-cabaret hybrid" on an album featuring "what is quite possibly the most exquisite 'Hallelujah' ever recorded". Jon O’Brien wrote in a review for the AllMusic website: "A graceful and respectful homage to a true musical icon, Matador: The Songs of Leonard Cohen cements O’Callaghan’s position as one of his most accomplished interpreters."

Named after the Toronto tavern that Cohen frequented in the 1960s, Matador is unusual for a pop music album since, although electric guitar can be heard on one song ("Everybody Knows"), none of the tracks features electric bass guitar. The violinist, cellist and pianist on the album, Patipatanakoon, Borys and Parker, are better-known as the Canadian chamber music ensemble the Gryphon Trio. One song ("The Smokey Life") is a duet with Steven Page, a founder member of Barenaked Ladies. Matador was produced with financial assistance from the Government of Canada through the Department of Canadian Heritage's Canada Music Fund.

Among many other venues, O'Callaghan performed songs from this album at MusicFest Vancouver, at Global Cabaret Festival and at the Aylmer Performing Arts concert series.

Track listing 

All songs written by Leonard Cohen except where noted.

 "The Gypsy's Wife" (4:16)
 "The Window" (5:24)
 "Dance Me to the End of Love" (4:13)
 "Who by Fire" (3:12)
 "Alexandra Leaving" (5:00) (Cohen, Sharon Robinson)
 "Everybody Knows" (3:59) (Cohen, Robinson)
 "Suzanne" (4:25)
 "If It Be Your Will" (3:38)
 "Anthem" (4:27)
 "The Smokey Life" (6:11)
 "Joan of Arc" (5:51)
 "I'm Your Man" (3:09)
 "Hallelujah" (3:58)

Personnel

Musicians 

 Patricia O'Callaghan – vocals
 John Gzowski – guitars, ukulele 
 David Restivo – piano, organ 
 Andrew Downing – bass 
 Mark Mariash – drums, percussion 
 Annalee Patipatanakoon – violin 
 Roman Borys – cello 
 Jamie Parker – piano 
 Max Christie – clarinet 
 Ernie Tollar – sax and flutes
 Mike Ross – guest singer
 Sienna Dahlen – guest singer
 Maryem Tollar – guest singer
 Steven Page – guest singer

Recording personnel 

 Patricia O'Callaghan – co-producer
 Jeremy Darby – co-producer/engineer
 Andrew Downing – associate producer/arranger
 Andrew Heppner – assistant engineer
 Sam Ibbett – assistant engineer
 Jeff Wolpert – mixing and mastering

References

External links 

Patricia O'Callaghan official website
Cabaret singer fuses pop and classical. Inside Toronto

2012 albums
Patricia O'Callaghan albums